Ben Rawlence is a British writer who has written three books: “The Treeline: the last forest and the future of life on earth” (2022) Radio Congo: Signals of Hope From Africa's Deadliest War (2012) and City of Thorns: Nine Lives in the World's Largest Refugee Camp (2016). From 2006 to 2013 he was a researcher for Human Rights Watch's Africa division. Rawlence has also written for The New York Times, The Guardian and London Review of Books. He lives in the Black Mountains, Wales where he is the founding director of Black Mountains College, an institution devoted to creative and adaptive thinking in the face of the climate and ecological emergency.

Education
From the years 1986 to 1993, Rawlence was educated at Bishop Wordsworth's School, a state grammar school for boys, in the city of Salisbury, in Wiltshire, in the west of England, followed by the School of Oriental and African Studies at the University of London, where he gained a BA in Swahili and history, and the University of Chicago, where he gained an MA in international relations.

Life and work
From 2006 to 2013, Rawlence was a researcher for Human Rights Watch (HRW) in its Africa division, covering at different times the Horn of Africa, Kenya, Nigeria, Uganda, and Zanzibar. He has also worked as an adviser to the Civic United Front, a liberal party in Tanzania, and as a foreign affairs adviser to the Liberal Democrats in the UK Parliament. He has written for The New York Times, The Guardian and London Review of Books.

Rawlence's first book, Radio Congo: Signals of Hope From Africa's Deadliest War (2012), is about how people are living amid war in eastern Democratic Republic of the Congo.

In 2010, whilst working for Human Rights Watch, Rawlence visited the refugee camp complex of Dadaab on the eastern Kenyan border with Somalia, then home to around 300,000 people. In 2011 he returned for the first of seven long visits over four years. Building on his years of research conducted for Human Rights Watch, he interviewed young Somali refugees living there, and saw the camp, which already was the largest refugee settlement in the world, grow further. His resulting book, City of Thorns: Nine Lives in the World's Largest Refugee Camp (2016), alternates between portraits of these residents and "big-picture accounts of the regional turmoil that drove them there ... and continues to shape their lives". The book received positive reviews in the Los Angeles Times, The Economist, and by one reviewer in The New York Times,

His latest book is about the Arctic frontier of the boreal forest, The Treeline, to be published by Jonathan Cape in the UK and St. Martin's Press in the USA, in 2021.

Rawlence lives in the Black Mountains, Wales.

He is the founder and Director of Black Mountains College.

Publications

Publications by Rawlence
Radio Congo: Signals of Hope From Africa's Deadliest War.
London: OneWorld, 2013. .
Radio Congo: Voyage au Cœur du Congo des Africains. Paris: Globe, 2014. . Translation by Lucie Delplanque. French-language edition
City of Thorns: Nine Lives in the World's Largest Refugee Camp
This biographic follows the stories of nine individuals who fled, started and/or left the camp of Dadaab. The book primarily views the effects of the conflict through the eyes of the protagonists, while interspersed with commentary on the larger political and economic forces at work. City of Thorns is an urgent human story with deep international repercussions, brought to life through the people who call Dadaab home.
London; New York: Picador, 2016. . Hardback.
London: Portobello, 2016. . Paperback.
Stadt der Verlorenen: Leben im größten Flüchtlingslager der Welt. Zürich: Nagel & Kimche, 2016. . Translation by Bettina Münch and Kathrin Razum. German-language edition.

Publications with contributions by Rawlence
Between a Rock and a Hard Place: African NGOs, Donors and the State. Edited by Jim Igoe and Tim Kelsall. Durham, NC: Carolina Academic Press, 2005. . Rawlence contributes the chapter "NGOs and the new field of African politics"

Awards
 Open Society Foundations Fellow 2013

 Dayton Literary Peace Prize (USA), Runner-Up, 2016.

 Kapucinski Prize (Poland) shortlisted, 2017.

 LA Times Book Award (USA), shortlisted 2016.

References

External links

Ben Rawlence: "City of Thorns" | Talks at Google

Living people
English non-fiction writers
People educated at Bishop Wordsworth's School
People from Wiltshire
Radio in the Democratic Republic of the Congo
Year of birth missing (living people)
Alumni of the University of London
University of Chicago alumni